The Order of Saint Stephen (Official: Sacro Militare Ordine di Santo Stefano Papa e Martire, "Holy Military Order of St. Stephen Pope and Martyr") is a Roman Catholic Tuscan dynastic military order founded in 1561.  The order was created by Cosimo I de' Medici, first Grand Duke of Tuscany.  The last member of the Medici dynasty to be a leader of the order was Gian Gastone de Medici in 1737.  The order was permanently abolished in 1859 by the annexation of Tuscany to the Kingdom of Sardinia. The former Kingdom of Italy and the current Italian Republic also did not recognize the order as a legal entity but tolerates it as a private body.

History

The order was founded by Cosimo I de' Medici, first Grand Duke of Tuscany, with the approbation of Pope Pius IV on 1 October 1561. The rule chosen was that of the Benedictine Order. The first grand master was Cosimo himself and he was followed in that role by his successors as grand duke. The dedication to the martyred Pope Stephen I, whose feast day is 2 August, derives from the date of Cosimo's victories at the Battle of Montemurlo on 1 August 1537 and the Battle of Marciano (Scannagallo) on 2 August 1554.

The objective of the order was to fight the Ottoman Turks and the pirates that sailed Mediterranean Sea in the 16th century. The Turks and the pirates were making dangerous inroads on the coast of the Tyrrhenian Sea where Cosimo had recently inaugurated the new port of Livorno. Cosimo also needed a symbolic fight to unite the nobility of the different cities that combined to form his new grand duchy (including Florence and Siena), and to demonstrate his support of the Roman Catholic Church. Finally, the creation of a Tuscan military order would also strengthen the prestige, both internal and international, of Cosimo's new state.

In its early years, the Order took part successfully in the Spanish wars against the Ottomans, being present at the siege of Malta (1565), the Battle of Lepanto (1571) and the 1607 capture of Annaba in Algeria by the then admiral Jacopo Inghirami. They burned the city, killed 470 people and took 1,500 captives. After its aggressive capabilities had been recognized, the Order concentrated on the defence of the Mediterranean coasts against Turkish and African pirates. In particular, the Knights made some incursions into the Aegean Islands controlled by the Turks, and took part in the campaigns in Dalmatia, Negroponte and Corfu. The organization peaked in the early 17th century, when it counted 600 knights and 2,000 other soldiers, sailors, and oarsmen. Of the 3,756 knights who served in the organization between 1562 and 1737, 68 percent were Tuscans, 28 percent came from neighboring Italian states (mostly the Papal States), and 4 percent came from elsewhere.Gregory Hanlon. "The Twilight Of A Military Tradition: Italian Aristocrats And European Conflicts, 1560-1800." Routledge: 1997. Page 38.

After 1640, military involvement was reduced. The Order concentrated on the coastal defence and on ordnance duties, but did not avoid the chance to send help to the Republic of Venice, then engaged in a desperate war against the Ottoman Empire. The order's last military action dates from 1719. Grand Duke Peter Leopold of Tuscany promoted a reorganization of the order, turning it into an institute for education of the Tuscan nobility.

On 7 March 1791, six months after becoming Emperor, Leopold abdicated the Grand Duchy to his younger son, Ferdinand III, the founder of the present Grand Ducal House. Although Ferdinand was the first European sovereign to recognize the French Republic, he was forced to submit to the French authorities who occupied the Grand Duchy in 1799. He abdicated both the Grand Duchy and the Grand Magistery of Saint Stephen. The order survived during the short-lived Kingdom of Etruria. Following the restoration of Ferdinand III in 1814, the revival of the Order was proposed. By a decree dated 1815 the Ripristinazione dell'Ordine dei Cavalieri di S. Stefano was proclaimed. The Order was again dissolved in 1859, when Tuscany was annexed to the Kingdom of Sardinia.

Currently

The descendants of the former Tuscan ruling family maintain that the Order of Saint Stephen was a religious and dynastic institution not subject to dissolution by the Italian authorities. Today, Archduke Sigismund, Grand Duke of Tuscany awards an Order of Saint Stephen which he claims to be a continuation of the order founded by Grand Duke Cosimo I. Approximately 80 individuals are currently associated with this order.  All members must be Roman Catholic, although exceptions are made for Heads of State and members of royal families who are members of the other Christian denominations.

Eligibility
To join the Order a postulant had to be at least eighteen years of age, able to meet the financial obligations of membership, make the necessary noble proofs and not be descended from heretics.  The initial seat of the order was on Elba before moving to Pisa. The Knights' Square in Pisa, on which their palace faces, is named after the Order. The Coat of Arms include a red cross with eight points, flanked by golden lilies.

Knights of Grace
The following have been designated Knights of Grace of the Order of Saint Stephen:
 Alfred I, Prince of Windisch-Grätz
 Vincenzo Antinori
 Archduke Charles Stephen of Austria
 Ernst I, Duke of Saxe-Altenburg
 Ferdinand III, Grand Duke of Tuscany
 Archduke Franz Salvator of Austria
 Archduke Johann Salvator of Austria
 Archduke Joseph Ferdinand of Austria
 Archduke Karl Salvator of Austria
 Archduke Leopold Ferdinand of Austria
 Leopold II, Grand Duke of Tuscany
 Giovanni Pacini
 Archduke Peter Ferdinand of Austria

References
 Gregor Gatscher-Riedl, Mario Strigl, Die roten Ritter. Zwischen Medici, Habsburgern und Osmanen. Die Orden und Auszeichnungen des Großherzogtums Toskana. Vienna 2014. .

External links

1561 establishments in Italy
Dynastic orders
Orders, decorations, and medals of Tuscany
Catholic orders of chivalry
History of Pisa
History of Tuscany
Christianity in Tuscany
Military orders (monastic society)